Football Club Megasport («Megasport» Fýtbol Klýby) were a Kazakh professional football club based in Almaty. The club was founded in 2005. They were members of Kazakhstan Premier League. At the end of 2008, they merged with Alma-Ata to form Lokomotiv Astana.

Achievements 
Kazakhstan First Division Runner-Up: 1
2007

Megasport, FC
Megasport, FC
Megasport, FC
2005 establishments in Kazakhstan
2009 disestablishments in Kazakhstan